The Pa-O National Liberation Army (abbreviated PNLA) is a Pa-O insurgent group in Myanmar (Burma). It is the armed wing of the Pa-O National Liberation Organisation.  The PNLA, along with other smaller Pa-O military groups, administers the Pa-O Self-Administered Zone, which consists of three townships in southern Shan State: Hopong, Hsi Hseng, and Pinlaung townships.

The PNLA signed a "Five-Point State-Level Agreement" and an "Eight-Point Union-Level Agreement" with the government of Myanmar on 25 August 2012.

History
From 7–9 December 2009, a Pa-O National Conference was held in the Pa-O Self-Administered Zone, and the Pa-O People's Liberation Organization (PPLO), led by Colonel Khun Okkar, and Shan State Nationalities People's Liberation Organization, led by Brigadier General Khun Ti Soung, merged and established the Pa-O National Liberation Army (PNLA) and its political wing, the Pa-O National Liberation Organisation (PNLO). Group leaders then drafted the PNLO constitution, which became the de facto constitution for the Pa-O SAZ. Attendees of the conference included members of the Pa-O Youth Organization, the Pa-Oh Labor Union and individuals such as U Khun Myint Tun (Thaton MP in the 1990 general election) and Khun Tin Swe (member of the NCUB). Khun Okker was elected as chairman, and Khun Ti Soung as vice-chairman. The founding members chose the name Pa-O National Liberation Army (PNLO) to honour the former PNLO's start of and commitment to the "third revolution".

The first PNLO/A congress was held at Laybwer military camp on 16 May 2013, and concluded on 20 May 2013. New central committee members were elected, and Khun Myint Tun was appointed the new chairman. Previous chairmen Khun Okker and Khun Ti Soung have since become patrons.

Ceasefire agreements
On 25 August 2012, the government and PNLA agreed on a "Five-Point State-Level Agreement" and an "Eight-Point Union-Level Agreement".

The state level peacemaking groups and the PNLA agreed with the following five points:
 1. Both sides are to cease attacks from 25 August 2012 onwards.
 2. Both sides are to remain in their own respective designated areas, which are the territory they currently occupy.
 3. Both sides are to not distribute arms or materiel to groups outside their designated areas.
 4. Unarmed liaison offices are to be established for both sides at Taunggyi, Hsihseng and Maukmai (mutually agreed on by both sides).
 5. Official Pa-O representative groups are to be created to hold talks with state level peacemaking groups, and to start further union level peace talks during a period of three months beginning on 25 August 2012.

The Union Peacemaking Work Committee and the PNLA agreed with the following eight points:
 1. To further discuss on ceasefires and how to strengthen and further develop them.
 2. To coordinate on matters related to code of conduct and discipline amongst officials.
 3. To provide assistance by the Union Peacemaking Work Committee for running liaison offices.
 4. To continue to provide the locations of PNLO/PNLA troops to the government.
 5. To cooperate in the fight against narcotics (illicit drugs).
 6. To coordinate on matters related to media.
 7. To coordinate on matters related to food, clothing and shelter of soldiers.
 8. To coordinate on matters related to public security and basic agriculture.

References

Rebel groups in Myanmar
Paramilitary organisations based in Myanmar
1949 establishments in Burma
2009 establishments in Myanmar